The Scottish Sports Hall of Fame is the national sports hall of fame of Scotland, set up in 2002. It is a joint project organised by sportscotland, the national governmental body for Scottish sport, and National Museums Scotland. It is also funded by BBC Scotland and donations from the general public. The founding patrons were Anne, Princess Royal, a notable supporter of the Scotland national rugby union team; First Minister Jack McConnell; and Formula One triple world champion Jackie Stewart.

Inductees
As of 2015, there have been eight rounds of inductions into the Hall of Fame:
 2002: initial 50 inductees.
 2003: 14 inductees.
 2004: 6 inductees.
 2007: 8 inductees.
 2008: 4 inductees.
 2010: 6 inductees.
 2012: 6 inductees.
 2015: 5 inductees.

Athletics and Highland games
Bill Anderson (1937-2019)
Donald Dinnie (1837–1916)
Wyndham Halswelle (1882–1915)
Eric Liddell (1902–1945)
Liz McColgan (born 1964)
George McNeill (born 1947)
Yvonne Murray (born 1964)
Arthur James Robertson (1879–1957)
Ian Stewart (born 1949)
Lachie Stewart (born 1943)
Allan Wells (born 1952)

Baseball

Bobby Thomson (1923–2010)

Bowls
Richard Corsie (born 1966)
Willie Wood (born 1938)

Boxing
Ken Buchanan (born 1945)
Benny Lynch (1913–1946)
Walter McGowan (1942-2016)
Dick McTaggart (born 1935)
Jackie Paterson (1920–1966)
Jim Watt (born 1948)

Cricket
Mike Denness (1940–2013)

Curling
Rhona Martin (born 1966)

Cycling 
Chris Hoy (born 1976)
Robert Millar (born 1958)
Graeme Obree (born 1965)

Diving
Peter Heatly (1924–2015)

Equestrianism
Ian Stark (born 1954)

Football
Jim Baxter (1939–2001)
Billy Bremner (1942–1997)
Matt Busby (1909–1994)
Kenny Dalglish (born 1951)
Archie Gemmill (born 1947)
John Greig (born 1942)
Jimmy Johnstone (1944–2006)
Denis Law (born 1940)
Ally McCoist (born 1962)
Jimmy McGrory (1904–1982)
Billy McNeill (1940–2019)
Rose Reilly (born 1955)
Bill Shankly (1913–1981)
Gordon Smith (1924–2004)
Jock Stein (1922–1985)

Golf

Willie Anderson (1879–1910)
Tommy Armour (1895–1968)
James Braid (1870–1950)
Sandy Lyle (born 1958)
Old Tom Morris (1821–1908)
Young Tom Morris (1851–1875)
Belle Robertson (born 1936)
Jessie Valentine (1915–2006)

Horse racing
Willie Carson (born 1942)

Judo
George Kerr (born 1937)
Graeme Randall (born 1975)

Motorsport

Louise Aitken-Walker (born 1960)
Jim Clark (1936–1968)
Jimmie Guthrie (1897–1937)
Steve Hislop (1962–2003)
Bob McIntyre (1928–1962)
Colin McRae (1968–2007)
Jackie Stewart (born 1939)

Mountaineering and hillwalking

Robert Barclay Allardice (1779–1854)
Dougal Haston (1940–1977)
Hamish MacInnes (1930–2020)

Rowing
Wally Kinnear (1880–1974)

Rugby union
Finlay Calder (born 1957)
Douglas Elliot (1923–2005)
Gavin Hastings (born 1962)
Andy Irvine (born 1951)
George MacPherson (1903–1981)
Ian McGeechan (born 1946)
Mark Morrison (1878–1945)
Ken Scotland (born 1936)
David Sole (born 1962)
Robert Wilson Shaw (1913–1979)

Sailing
Chay Blyth (born 1940)
Shirley Robertson (born 1968)

Shinty
John Cattanach (1885–1915)

Shooting
Alister Allan (born 1944)
Shirley McIntosh (born 1965)

Swimming
Ian Black (born 1941)
Kenny Cairns (born 1957)
Catherine Gibson (1931–2013)
Elenor Gordon (1933–2014)
Ellen King (1909–1994)
Margaret McEleny (born 1965)
Bob McGregor (born 1944)
Belle Moore (1894–1975)
Nancy Riach (1927–1947)
Jack Wardrop (born 1932)
David Wilkie (born 1954)

Table tennis
Helen Elliot (1927–2013)

Tennis
Winnie Shaw (1947–1992)

Water polo
George Cornet (1877–1952)

Weightlifting
John McNiven (born 1935)

Multiple sports
Leslie Balfour-Melville (1854–1937), cricket, rugby union, tennis and golf
Launceston Elliot (1874–1930), weightlifting and wrestling
Isabel Newstead (1955–2007), 18 Paralympic medals in swimming, athletics and shooting.
Kenneth Grant MacLeod (1888–1967), rugby union, cricket, football, athletics and golf

Former members
Rodney Pattisson (born 1943), sailing, removed in 2012 upon request.

See also
Sport in Scotland

References

External links
 

 
Sports museums in Scotland
Halls of fame in Scotland
All-sports halls of fame
 
Sports Hall
Sports
2001 establishments in Scotland
2001 in British sport